The Grand prix national de l'architecture ("Grand National Prize of Architecture") is a French prize awarded by a jury of twenty persons under the chairmanship of the Ministry of Culture to an architect, or an architectural firm, for recognition of an outstanding contribution to architecture. Established in 1975 and relaunched in 2004, it is the highest French award in architecture. It comes with a monetary prize of 10,000 euros.

Winners
The prize has been awarded to:
 1975 - Jean Willerval
 1976 - Roger Taillibert
 1977 - Paul Andreu; Roland Simounet
 1978 - Jean Renaudie
 1979 - Claude Parent
 1980 - Paul Chemetov
 1981 - Atelier de Montrouge (Gérard Thurnauer, Pierre Riboulet and Jean-Louis Véret)
 1982 - Claude Vasconi
 1983 - Henri Ciriani
 1984 - Edmond Lay
 1985 - Michel Andrault and Pierre Parat
 1986 - Adrien Fainsilber
 1987 - Jean Nouvel
 1988 - (not awarded)
 1989 - André Wogenscky; Henri Gaudin (prize refused by the winner)
 1990 - Francis Soler
 1991 - Christian Hauvette
 1992 - Christian de Portzamparc
 1993 - Dominique Perrault
 1994 - (not awarded)
 1995 - (not awarded)
 1996 - Bernard Tschumi
 1997 - (not awarded)
 1998 - Jacques Hondelatte
 1999 - Massimiliano Fuksas 
 2000 - (not awarded)
 2001 - (not awarded)
 2002 - (not awarded)
 2003 - (not awarded)
 2004 - Patrick Berger
 2005 - (not awarded)
 2006 - Rudy Ricciotti
 2008 - Anne Lacaton and Jean-Philippe Vassal
 2010 - Frédéric Borel
 2011 - (not awarded)
 2012 - (not awarded)
 2013 - Marc Barani
 2014 - (not awarded)
 2015 - (not awarded)
 2016 - Jean-Marc Ibos and Myrto Vitar

References

Architecture awards